W. H. C. Lawrence was a Canadian science fiction writer remembered as the author af the late 19th century novel, Storm of '92, published in 1889, which posited the scenario of Canada winning a war against the United States.  Eighty-five years later, in 1974, another Canadian author, Richard Rohmer revisited the theme in his novel, Ultimatum.

External links
Storm of '92 evaluated at the Fantastic Toronto website as "boring, banal propaganda written to boost the British Empire"
Bell, John. "Uneasy Union: A Checklist of English-Language Science Fiction Concerning Canadian Separatist Conflicts" (Storm of '92 mentioned in third paragraph)
Storm of '92 at the Open Library

Canadian science fiction writers
Year of birth missing
Year of death missing
Place of birth missing
Place of death missing